Bill Schuck is a former member of the Ohio House of Representatives.

References

Republican Party members of the Ohio House of Representatives
Living people
Year of birth missing (living people)